opened in Tomakomai, Hokkaidō, Japan in 1985. The museum reopened after renewal work in 2013. The collection and display documents the natural and cultural history of the city and the area, and includes specimens collected by local resident Orii Hyōjirō as well as materials relating to the Ainu and the time of the Hokkaidō Development Commission.

See also
 Hokkaido Museum

References

External links
  Tomakomai City Museum

Museums in Hokkaido
Tomakomai, Hokkaido
Museums established in 1985
1985 establishments in Japan